Louis Timothy Stone (1875 – March 13, 1933), also known as Louis Stone, was an American journalist who fabricated stories about the flora and fauna surrounding his town of Winsted, Connecticut, thus earning himself the name of the Winsted Liar. The most notorious story attributed to him concerned the sighting of a 'wild man' in the woods near 'Winsted', although research by Michael T. Shoemaker and Gary Mangiacopra suggests that Stone was not actually responsible for this story.

Biography
Stone was born in 1875 in Winsted, Connecticut, where he spent his whole life. At the age of thirteen, he began working as a printer's devil at the Winsted Evening Citizen, later becoming a reporter for the same newspaper.

In 1895, Stone fabricated what became his most famous story, when he claimed that there had been sightings of a 'wild man' in the woods near Winsted. In this colorful telling the Wild Man "wears no clothes, his eyes swim in red fire and he's a good rifle shot." He continued to create weekly reports, mostly about unusual flora and fauna around Winsted, which were reprinted in many newspapers. In tribute to his work, a billboard in Winsted announced:

Death
Stone died on March 13, 1933, and the residents of Winsted named a bridge in honor of him.

Notable hoaxes
Some of the stories invented by Stone include:
 A hen that rode into Winsted on a train and laid an egg to pay the fare
 A tree that grew baked apples
 A cow that was locked in an ice house and produced ice cream for two weeks after its release
 A farmer who lost his watch and found it seven years later in the stomach of one of his cows, where it had been kept wound by the cow's stomach muscles

References

External links
Lou Stone: The Winsted Liar at the Museum of Hoaxes

American male journalists
1875 births
1933 deaths
Hoaxes in the United States
19th-century hoaxes
People from Winsted, Connecticut
Journalists from Connecticut
19th-century American journalists
19th-century American male writers